Han Jiabao (Chinese: 韩家宝) is a Chinese professional footballer who currently plays for Liaoning Shenyang Urban in the China League One as a forward or midfielder.

Club career
Han Jiabao would start his career in the 2006 Chinese league season with Dalian Yiteng and see them win promotion to the second tier at the end of the season. Within the 2007 league season he would then go on to play in eleven games and scored one goal, however in the following season while Han played in a further twelve games he couldn't prevent the club from relegation at the end of the 2008 campaign. After having a personally impressive season in 2010 where he scored five goals he would attract the interests of top-tier club Dalian Shide F.C. and the beginning of the 2011 league season and made his debut for them on June 26, 2011, against Shanghai Shenhua in a 2–1 defeat. By the beginning of the 2012 league season Han was unable to add any more appearances for Dalian Shide and he was loaned out to third-tier club Hebei Zhongji. In March 2013, Han was loaned to China League Two side Qingdao Hainiu until 31 December 2013.
In March 2014, Han transferred to China League Two side Dalian Transcendence.
On 15 July 2016, Han transferred to Chinese Super League side Henan Jianye.

On 23 January 2017, Han moved to fellow League Two side Shenzhen Ledman.

Career statistics 
Statistics accurate as of match played 31 December 2020.

Honours

Club
Qingdao Hainiu
 China League Two: 2013

References

External links

1990 births
Living people
Chinese footballers
Footballers from Dalian
Zhejiang Yiteng F.C. players
Dalian Shide F.C. players
Hebei F.C. players
Qingdao F.C. players
Dalian Transcendence F.C. players
Henan Songshan Longmen F.C. players
Sichuan Jiuniu F.C. players
Chinese Super League players
China League One players
Association football midfielders